ReadItSwapIt (RISI) was a book exchange website co-founded in 2005 by Andrew Bathgate and Neil Ferguson of London, UK.  And closed in Sept 2017. It facilitated direct swapping of books among its members in the UK.

Operation 
ReadItSwapIt operated a "direct swap" method of exchange, where a single book belonging to one member was exchanged for a single book belonging to another member. This is contrast to other book swap sites, which offer a credit-based system of exchange.

References 
 Fresco, Adam (January 2, 2006). “Chapter and verse of online book swaps”. The Times

External links 
ReadItSwapIt
A novel way to reduce costs in  The Times online (behind pay wall)

Book swapping